is a Japanese actor and singer.  Hino was born in Tokyo and raised in Osaka. Hino appeared in many jidaigeki television dramas. He is best known for his roles in the Hissatsu series.

He began his acting career at the age of 13. In 1966, he made his film debut with Izukoe. In 1973, he was given the stage name Shōhei Hino by novelist Shōtarō Ikenami. In the same year, he won popularity through his role Hashiba Hideyoshi in Kunitori Monogatari. In 1974, Hino made film appearance for the first time in 8 years and played lead role for the first time in Orenochi wa Taninnochi" directed by Toshio Masuda. He was one of the candidates for the role of main character Genji in Shohei Imamura's film Eijanaika but eventually he played a smaller role. As a singer Hino debuted in 1977 with the single "Sonomamani".

From 2011, Hino has been hosting a travel program "Nippon Odan Kokorotabi" on NHK-BS which he travels around Japan by bicycle.

In 2012, Hino played General Hideki Tojo in the film Emperor.

Selected filmography

Films

Television

Discography

Singles
Sonomamani (1977)
Tazunetemo Iikai (1978)
Hitori (1978)
Ore (1980)
Fanny (1982)
Kitakaze no Naka (1982)
Akai Ito (1983)
Yume no Tsuzuki (1983)
Damatte Oreni Tsuitekoi (1986)
Gomenne (1991)
Omoideniserete tamaruka (1991)
Kotoshi no Bara (2009)

Albums
Fuyuyo Koi (1977)
Yume Gokochi (1978)
Doryuzu (1981)
Furimuite (1983)
Shikōro (1983)
Gomenne (1991)
Womantachi eno Komoriuta (2009)

References

External links

Shōhei Hino Official site
Shōhei Hino on NHK NHK人物録

Japanese male actors
1949 births
Living people
Actors from Tokyo
Japanese male film actors
Japanese male television actors
20th-century Japanese male singers
20th-century Japanese singers
21st-century Japanese male actors